The Canton System (1757–1842; ,  "Single [port] trading relations") served as a means for Qing China to control trade with the West within its own country by focusing all trade on the southern port of Canton (now Guangzhou). The protectionist policy arose in 1757 as a response to a perceived political and commercial threat from abroad on the part of successive Chinese emperors.

From the late seventeenth century onwards, Chinese merchants, known as Hongs, managed all trade in the port. Operating from the Thirteen Factories located on the banks of the Pearl River outside Canton, in 1760, by order of the Qing Qianlong Emperor, they became officially sanctioned as a monopoly known as the Cohong. Thereafter Chinese merchants dealing with foreign trade ("ocean traders", i.e. "overseas traders" or "foreign traders") acted through the Cohong under the supervision of the Guangdong Customs Supervisor, informally known as the "Hoppo", and the Governor-general of Guangzhou and Guangxi.

History

Origins

At the start of his reign, the Kangxi Emperor (r.16611722) faced a number of challenges, not the least of which was to integrate his relatively new dynasty with the Chinese Han majority. 
The Manchu-led Qing dynasty had only come to power in 1644, replacing the Ming dynasty. Support for the previous rulers remained strong, particularly in the south of the country. 
Kangxi twice banned all maritime trade for strategic reasons, to prevent any possible waterborne coup attempt. Several rebellions took place, including one led by Ming loyalist Koxinga and separately the Rebellion of the Three Feudatories, which led to the capture of Taiwan in 1683. Once the rebellions had been quelled, in 1684 Kangxi issued an edict:
Hǎiguān (海关), or customs stations, were subsequently opened at Canton, Macau, and Xiangshan County in Guangdong; Fuzhou, Nantai, and Xiamen (Amoy) in Fujian; Ningbo and Dinghai County in Zhejiang Province; and Huating County, Chongque, and Shanghai in Jiangsu Province.
One year later in 1685, foreign traders received permission to enter Chinese ports.

The Qing Court under Kangxi set up a trading company in Canton in 1686 to deal with Western trade known as the Yánghuò Háng (洋货行, literally "Ocean Trading House"). This dealt with both imports and exports with sub-offices responsible for taxes and import/export declarations respectively. When a ship arrived or departed, the Chinese merchant involved would visit the Ocean Trading House to pay any taxes due. This set up became the basis for the later Thirteen Factories through which all foreign trade would be conducted.

Although many ports on the coasts of China were open, most Westerners chose to trade at Canton as it is closer to Southeast Asia and it was not profitable to go further north.

In 1704, the Baoshang system was established. This system licensed trade with Western merchants: licences were granted to a number of Chinese merchants as long as they helped to collect duties from the Westerners, successfully aligning trading interests with the government's revenue collection. This was the predecessor for the later Cohong system.

Although he now had the foreign trade situation under control, Kangxi's liberal attitude towards religion led to a clash between Chinese and Christian spiritual authority. After Pope Clement XI issued his 1715 papal bull Ex illa die, which officially condemned Chinese religious practices, Kangxi expelled all missionaries from China except those employed in a technical or scientific advisory capacity by the Qing Court.

Implementation of the Cohong

In 1745, Kangxi's grandson the Qianlong Emperor ordered his court to implement changes to the Ocean Trading House system. Thereafter a local Chinese merchant stood as guarantor for every foreign trading vessel entering Canton Harbour and took full responsibility for the ship and its crew along with the captain and supercargo. Any tax payments due from a foreign trader were also to be guaranteed by the local merchant. With permission from the authorities, in 1760 Hong merchant Pan Zhencheng (潘振成) and nine others hong specializing in the western trade joined together to become the intermediary between the Qing government and the foreign traders. The role of the new body would be to purchase goods on behalf of the foreigners and deduct any taxes and duties payable for imports and exports; at the same time, according to Guangdong customs records (粤海關志, Yuèhǎi guān zhì), they established a new harbour authority to deal with tribute from Thailand and handle pay for the troops involved in trade as well as manage domestic maritime trade in the South China Sea. Henceforth, the Cohong possessed imperial authority to levy taxes on the foreign merchants as they saw fit.

Flint Affair

In 1757 the Qianlong Emperor banned all non-Russian ships from the ports of northern China. Russians were however not allowed to use Canton. All customs offices other than the one at Canton were closed. The emperor did this after receiving a petition regarding the presence of armed Western merchant ships all along the coast. The Western merchant ships were protected from pirates, and guarded against, by the Guangdong Navy, which was subsequently increased in strength.

Thereafter all such commerce was to be conducted via a single port under what became known as the Canton System (In Chinese: Yī kŏu tōngshāng (一口通商 literally, "Single-port commerce system"). During Qianlong's reign Qing foreign trade policies had a political aspect largely based on real or imagined threats from abroad; historian Angela Schottenhammer suggests that although the single port trading policy arose in part from lobbying by officials and Chinese merchants, it was more likely triggered by the activities of Flint in what became known as The Flint Affair (Hóng Rènhuī Shìjiàn, 洪任辉事件). Although the foreign merchants knew of the Cohong restriction, they had to balance a breach of etiquette against the risks of seeing their substantial investments in China destroyed by bribery and corruption. Englishman James Flint, a long-term East India Company supercargo and a fluent speaker of Chinese, became the focus of the impetus for change. Flint had been repeatedly warned to remain in Canton during the trading season and not to venture north in search of commercial opportunities. Despite this, back in 1755 Flint, together with Company director Samuel Harrison, sailed north to explore possibilities for trade in Zhejiang. In 1759, he again journeyed north to file a complaint in Ningbo over corruption amongst the officials in Canton. He had hoped that his criticisms of the current system would usher in a new era of free trade but instead, not only did his plan to open up the ports of Zhejiang fail, the Qing authorities reacted by imposing further restrictions on foreign trade. Worse still, Flint found himself deported to Macau where he was imprisoned between December 1759 and November 1762.

The emperor and his officials became alarmed at this breach of normal protocol and realized that something had to be done to control the  situation. The Qing court's previous laxity had effectively allowed a coterie of Chinese merchants and local officials to take over foreign commerce in the southern port according to their own best financial interests. One of the fundamental tenets of traditional Chinese diplomacy prohibited contact with Beijing except in the case of tributary envoys from other states.

The new rules, known as the Vigilance Towards Foreign Barbarian Regulations (Fángfàn wàiyí guītiáo, 防范外夷规条) or Five Counter-Measures Against the Barbarians (Fáng yí wŭ shì, 防夷五事) contained the following provisions:

1) Trade by foreign barbarians in Canton is prohibited during the winter.
2) Foreign barbarians coming to the city must reside in the foreign factories under the supervision and control of the Cohong.
3) Chinese citizens are barred from borrowing capital from foreign barbarians and from employment by them.
4) Chinese citizens must not attempt to gain information on the current market situation from foreign barbarians
5) Inbound foreign barbarian vessels must anchor in the Whampoa Roads and await inspection by the authorities.

Evaluation

The discovery of underground missionary activity in the late 1750s may have contributed to the Emperor's decision to concentrate foreigners in a single port. In his edict to establish the restriction, the Emperor specifically mentioned concerns about the strategic value of the interior regions to foreigners: Chinese government consultants were aware of Western military technological superiority and Westerners' record of having "set out to conquer every land they visited". The Kangxi Emperor, considering the Westerners to be highly successful, intrepid, clever, and profitable, already had concerns early on about the serious omnidirectional Western threat to China, if China ever became weakened.

The Canton system did not completely affect Chinese trade with the rest of the world as Chinese merchants, with their  large three-masted ocean junks, were heavily involved in global trade. By sailing to and from Siam, Indonesia and Philippines, they were major facilitators of the global trading system; the era was even described by Carl Trocki as a "Chinese century" of global commerce.

Under the system, the Qianlong Emperor restricted trade with foreigners on Chinese soil only for licensed Chinese merchants (Cohongs), while the British government on their part issued a monopoly charter for trade only to the British East India Company. This arrangement was not challenged until the 19th century when the idea of free trade was popularised in the West. The concept of restricting trade to a single port was also used in Western countries such as Spain and Portugal. Chinese merchants could also trade freely and legally with Westerners (Spanish and Portuguese) in Xiamen and Macao, or with any country when trade was conducted through ports outside China such as Manila and Batavia. 
Although shipping was regulated, the Qianlong emperor's administration was diligent in accommodating the requisites of Western merchants. They hired a growing body of Western assistants for the Customs Office to help manage their fellow countrymen. The order to stay in Macao during the winter was lifted, tax was exempted on food, drink and basic supplies for Western merchants, and protections were granted to Westerners and their property. Chinese merchants were actually banned by Qing law from suing foreigners in Chinese courts, as the Qianlong Emperor believed that good treatment of foreigners was essential for the government. In 1806, Chinese officials compromised with the British on the murder of a Chinese man by British seamen, as Westerners refused to be punished under Chinese law, even though local citizens vigorously protested what they considered a miscarriage of justice. In 1816, the Jiaqing Emperor dismissed a British embassy for their refusal to kowtow, but he sent them an apologetic letter with gifts (the British simply discarded them in a storeroom without reading).  The Qianlong Emperor granted Lord Macartney a golden scepter, an important symbol of peace and wealth, but this was dismissed by the British as worthless. The British, on the other hand, ignored Chinese laws and warnings not to deploy military forces in Chinese waters. The British landed troops in Macao despite a Chinese and Portuguese agreement to bar foreign forces from Macao, and then in the War of 1812 attacked American ships deep in the inner harbour of Canton (the Americans had previously robbed British ships in Chinese waters as well). These, in combination with the British support to Nepal during their invasion of Tibet and later the British invasion of Nepal after it became a Chinese tributary state, led the Chinese authorities to become highly suspicious of British intentions.

The First Opium War

A seemingly insatiable western demand for tea from China towards the end of the 18th century caused a significant deficit in the British balance of trade. The Chinese had little interest in Western goods and would only accept silver in payment. This spurred the East India Company to sell opium grown on its plantations in India to independent traders, who shipped it on to China to sell in exchange for silver, despite the fact that opium was already illegal in China.  China tried to stop the importation of this opium, but the traders persisted.  Chinese attempts to regain control led to the First Opium War, when British gunboat diplomacy quickly forced China to sign an unequal treaty of trade.

Abolition
Following the signature of the 1842 Treaty of Nanking, British subjects are "allowed to reside, for the purpose of carrying on their mercantile pursuits, without molestation or restraint" at Canton, Shanghai, Xiamen (Amoy), Ningbo and Fuzhou. In addition, Article V of the Treaty specifically abolishes the Canton system, allowing British merchants, and eventually all foreign merchants, to deal with whomever they please in the newly-opened ports.

In 1859 Canton's trade moved to a new site on the reclaimed sandbank of Shamian Island, a short distance west of the former factories. By then much of the foreign trade with China had shifted to the by then British colony of Hong Kong (acquired under the Treaty of Nanking), and to the northern ports, with their advantage of proximity to Beijing as well as the Grand Canal and the Yellow River, both vital arteries in the internal trade of Qing China. By 1866, only 18 foreign firms still had offices in Canton while there were only 60 foreign residents excluding British Indians and tidewaiters (who boarded boats as part of custom's inspections) employed by Sir Robert Hart's Imperial Maritime Customs Service.

Legacy
The Massachusetts General Hospital, McLean Hospital, the Boston Athenæum, the Bunker Hill Monuments, public libraries, and an orphanage were built with the proceeds of opium smuggling.

By the time Hong Kong became a full-fledged British Colony, many of the merchants would be led by a newer generation of western hong merchants. Many of these companies would become the backbone of the young Hong Kong economy.

See also
 Century of humiliation
 Economic history of China before 1912
 Old China Trade
 Hongs
 Howqua
 Thirteen Factories
 Wu Tingju

Notes and references
Notes

Bibliography

Further reading
 Louis Dermigny, La Chine et l'Occident: le commerce à Canton au XVIIIe siècle, 1719–1833. Paris: SEVPEN, 1964.
 
 Liu Yong, The Dutch East India Company's Tea Trade with China, 1757–1781. Leiden and Boston: Brill, 2007. 
 Hoh-Cheung Mui and H. Lorna Mui, The Management of Monopoly: A Study of the East India Company's Conduct of Its Tea Trade, 1784–1833. Vancouver: University of British Columbia Press, 1984. 

 Paul Arthur Van Dyke. The Canton Trade: Life and Enterprise on the China Coast, 1700–1845. Hong Kong University Press,  2005.   .
 Paul Arthur Van Dyke. Merchants of Canton and Macao: Politics and Strategies in Eighteenth-Century Chinese Trade. Hong Kong University Press.2011.    
 Zhuang Guotu, Tea, Silver, Opium, and War: The International Tea Trade and Western Commercial Expansion into China in 1740–1840. Xiamen: Xiamen University Press, 1993.

Economy of the Qing dynasty
History of Guangzhou
History of foreign trade in China